Ancient Kangleipak was an ancient, lesser known civilisation, concentrated along the central plains of the modern day Kangleipak (Manipur), India.
The Kangla served as the foremost capital city of this realm from the 15th century BC upto the late 19th century AD.

History

Geography

The territory of this realm is mountainous and thereby, ancient Kangleipak consists of several smaller region each with its own dialect, cultural peculiarities, and identity.

In fact, there were seven independent kingdoms ruled by the seven clan dynasties in this realm. These seven principalities had their own capital cities.

Language

The Ancient Meitei language (early form of the modern Meitei language) had a wide array of Meitei scriptures (Puya (Meitei texts)), of numerous topics, written in the archaic Meitei script. 
One of the oldest scriptures is the Wakoklon Heelel Thilen Salai Amailon Pukok Puya, written in 1398 BC (verified by the National Archives of India, New Delhi).

Culture

Daily life
Most people of ancient Kangleipak were farmers tied to their lands. Their dwellings were restricted to immediate family members.

Architecture

The ancient architectural designs of common houses were believed to be sustainable, eco friendly and affordable. It gives a cooling effect during hot summer and a warming effect during chilling winter.

Religious beliefs

The ancient religion of the indigenous ethnicities of the hills and the plains is the Sanamahism. The abstract concept of the space time entity is the ultimate God creator of the universe.
Beliefs in the divine and in the afterlife were ingrained in ancient Kangleipak from its inception. The ancient rulers were based on the divine right of kings.

Military

The Ancient Meitei military ran un the Lallup system. Lal-lup system (literally, Lal means war; lup means club or association or organization) was a predominant system in ancient Kangleipak. According to the system, every men of indigenous ethnicity of above 16 years of age was a member.

Related pages
 King Tang of Shang of China
 
 Bihu Loukon
 Stonehenge of Manipur
 Ancient Moirang

References

Other websites
 
 Discovery of Kangleipak
 The Kingdom of Manipur
 Thawan Thaba burial discovery A medieval findings lost amidst tragic ignorance By Phanjoubam Chingkheinganba

History of Manipur